Feld am See is a municipality in the district of Villach-Land in the Austrian state of Carinthia.

Geography
It is located in the Gegend valley of the Nock Mountains range at the shore of the Brennsee (or Feldsee), between the Mirnock massif in the southwest (el. ) and Wöllaner Nock in the northeast. The municipal area consists of one cadastral community, Rauth, also the oldest settlement in the area.

Neighboring municipalities

Population
The census in 2001 counted 1,188 inhabitants. 66.0% are Protestants (whole Carinthia: 10.3%), 27.5% are Roman Catholics, 0.8% are Muslims and 5.1% belong to other denominations.

History

The hidden Gegend was not populated until the High Middle Ages, when about 1300 its sunny northern side was stubbed and the name of the valley was first mentioned in a 1308 deed.

The settlement of Feld am See itself arose with the construction of a Protestant parish church in 1787. The remote Gegend valley had long been a centre of Crypto-protestantism, until the 1781 Patent of Toleration issued by Emperor Joseph II ended the Counter-Reformation persecutions. 

The lake called Brennsee was named after a local tavern and distillery (Brenn) which was founded in 1632. The present-day municipality was established in 1850; an elementary school was founded one year later. In the late 19th century summer tourism around the lake started. Between 1973 and 1991 Feld am See and neighbouring Afritz am See were united to a single municipality.

Politics

Seats in the municipal council (Gemeinderat) as of 2015 local elections:
Social Democratic Party of Austria (SPÖ): 6
Freedom Party of Austria (FPÖ): 6
Austrian People's Party (ÖVP): 3

Twin towns — sister cities

Feld am See is twinned with:
 Wilhermsdorf, Germany, since 1988

Cultural Activities and Associations
Several associations exist in Feld am See.
 MGV Feld am See - a male choral society
 Gemischter Chor Feld am See - a choir
 Frauentrachtengruppe Feld am See - a women's association wearing traditional costumes
 Trachtenkapelle Feld am See - a traditional Austrian big band
 Mirnock-Oldies - an Oldtimer association
 and some more

Sights
Main sights are:
 Protestant church of Feld am See (built in 1787)
 Catholic church of Feld am See (build in 1960)
 Alpen Wildpark Feld am See - a deer park and museum
 Mirnockriese - a stone statue of a legendary giant
Places to visit:
 Brennsee - one of two bathing lakes
 Afritzer See - the second bathing lake
 Feldpannalm - scenic mountain pasture

References

External links

Cities and towns in Villach-Land District